Selo Saraygirovskogo otdeleniya Urtakulskogo sovkhoza (Urtakül sovxozınıñ Harayğır büleksähe awılı) is a rural locality (a selo) in Urtakulsky Selsoviet, Buzdyaksky District, Bashkortostan, Russia. The population was 213 as of 2010. There are 3 streets.

Geography 
It is located 11 km north of Buzdyak (the district's administrative centre) by road.

References 

Rural localities in Buzdyaksky District